Aditi Sharma (born 4 September 1996) is an Indian actress and model who mainly works in Hindi television. She made her acting debut in 2018 and is best known for her portrayal of Meera Dhingra in Kaleerein and Roshni Ahmed Khan in Yehh Jadu Hai Jinn Ka!. Sharma made her web debut with Crashh in 2021.

Early life
Aditi Sharma was born on 4 September 1996 in New Delhi, India. She completed her secondary education from Hansraj Model School, New Delhi.

She started her career as a model, having walked for Amazon Fashion Week India. Later she appeared in number of TV commercials for various brands like Titan Raga, White Ponds Beauty BB+, Amazon, etc.

Career 
Aditi Sharma made her acting debut in a music video named Taare starring alongside Guru Randhawa in 2017. Later she appeared in two another Punjabi music videos Naan and Bekadra and a Haryanvi music video named Tu Raja ki Raj Dulari. In February 2018, she made her television debut as Meera Dhingra with Zee TV's Kaleerein opposite Arjit Taneja. The show ended on 16 November 2018.

In 2019, as a cameo appearance, she played Shivli Singh in Colors TV's Naagin 3. In October 2019, she starred opposite Vikram Singh Chauhan in Star Plus's fantasy romantic drama show Yehh Jadu Hai Jinn Ka! as Roshni Ahmed. The show ended after a year long run in November 2020. In 2021, she made her digital debut in Alt Balaji's Crashh which also starred Anushka Sen, Zain Imam and Rohan Mehra. Later she did two more music videos, Playboy alongside R Nait and Aadat Ve opposite Ninja.

Filmography

Television

Web series

Music videos

See also 
 List of Hindi television actresses
 List of Indian television actresses

References

External links 

 

Living people
Indian television actresses
Actresses in Hindi television
People from Delhi
Actors from Mumbai
1996 births